Eremonotus is a genus of flies belonging to the family Asilidae.

Species:
 Eremonotus hauseri Geller-Grimm & Hradsky, 1998 
 Eremonotus nudus Theodor, 1980

References

Asilidae
Asilidae genera